Francis Lessard (born May 30, 1979) is a Canadian former professional ice hockey forward.  He last played with the Trois-Rivières Blizzard of Ligue Nord-Américaine de Hockey (LNAH). He has played for the Atlanta Thrashers and  Ottawa Senators of the NHL, but has spent most of his career in the AHL. Lessard is generally known as an enforcer for his physical style of play and his ability to protect his teammates during a game.

Playing career
As a youth, Lessard played in the 1992 and 1993 Quebec International Pee-Wee Hockey Tournaments with the Rive-Nord Elites minor ice hockey team.

Drafted from the QMJHL's Val-d'Or Foreurs, Lessard's rights were traded to the Philadelphia Flyers in 1999 while still at junior level.  He spent three seasons with their AHL affiliate the Philadelphia Phantoms before he was traded to the Atlanta Thrashers.

With the Thrashers, Lessard made his National Hockey League debut with the Thrashers during the 2001–02 season.  In that season, Lessard won the Calder Cup with the Chicago Wolves.  Lessard played 91 games over four seasons with Atlanta before moving to the New York Rangers organization in 2006. He played two seasons for the Hartford Wolf Pack of the AHL before signing with the Phoenix Coyotes in 2008, playing two seasons for the San Antonio Rampage of the AHL. He signed with the Ottawa Senators in August 2010.

Career statistics

Awards and honours
 1997-98 - Memorial Cup All-Star Team

Transactions
 August 8, 2010 - Signed as an unrestricted free agent by the Ottawa Senators.
 July 3, 2008 - Signed as a free agent by the Phoenix Coyotes.
 September 13, 2006 - Invited by the New York Rangers to training camp.
 March 15, 2002 - Atlanta Thrashers traded David Harlock and third-round (Tyler Redenbach) and seventh-round (Joe Pavelski) selections in 2003 to the Philadelphia Flyers for Francis Lessard.
 May 25, 1999 - Carolina Hurricanes traded Francis Lessard to the Philadelphia Flyers for eighth-round selection (Antti Jokella) in 1999.
 June 21, 1997 - Drafted by the Carolina Hurricanes in the third round (80th overall) in 1997.

References

External links

1979 births
Living people
Atlanta Thrashers players
Binghamton Senators players
Canadian ice hockey defencemen
Carolina Hurricanes draft picks
Chicago Wolves players
Drummondville Voltigeurs players
French Quebecers
Hartford Wolf Pack players
Ice hockey people from Montreal
Ottawa Senators players
Philadelphia Phantoms players
San Antonio Rampage players
Val-d'Or Foreurs players